The XXIInd Central American and Caribbean Games were held in Veracruz, Mexico from November 17, 2014 to November 1, 2014.

Results by event

See also

References

External links

Nations at the 2014 Central American and Caribbean Games
2014
Central American and Caribbean Games